Astro Xiao Tai Yang is a 24-hour channel targeting Mandarin-speaking children aged 4–12 years old, providing educational and entertaining programmes. The channel line up consists of preschool learning, animation, music, science and arts.

Astro Xiao Tai Yang is currently available for free-to-view on Astro and NJOI customers in Malaysia on Channel 344 until informed.

Programmes

 The Adventures Of Star Cat
 All New Jackie Chan Adventures
 BB Bento
 Boonie Cubs
 Cam & Leon
 Cocomon
 The Diary of Amos Lee
 Doo Doo: Rhythm & Beat
 Fables of the East With Child Actors
 Find Out How
 The Five Elves
 Four Little Scholars
 Fruity Pie
 Future Girl
 Go Go Trilingual
 GG Bond
 Gogobus
 Happy Dragon 100,000 Whys
 Happy Friends
 Hello Pinkfong (EN Version) Jing-Ju Cats Katuri Kids Travel Too Language Bingo Little Counselor Lucky Comes with Lions Masha and the Bear Mighty Goat Squad My Kids Can Organize My Little Monkey King New Happy Dad and Son Pleasant Goat Fun Class QQ Learn At Home Robocar Poli Storytelling Super Wings Tayo the Little Bus (Upcoming)
 Three Little Wishes Tong Tong's Wonderland Whee Wheels Word Whiz XTY Fun Fun Club XTY Kids Talent Show''

External links
 xuan.com.my/channels/xty

Astro Malaysia Holdings television channels
Television channels and stations established in 2007